Udea murinalis is a species of moth in the family Crambidae. It is found in France, Switzerland, Austria and Italy.

References

Moths described in 1842
murinalis
Moths of Europe
Taxa named by Josef Emanuel Fischer von Röslerstamm